Brian Ransom may refer to:

 Brian Ransom (gridiron football) (born 1960), American football player
 Brian Ransom (politician) (1940—2020), Canadian politician